National Primary Route 10, or just Route 10 (or ) is a National Road Route of Costa Rica, located in the Cartago, Limón provinces.

Description
In Cartago province the route covers Cartago canton (Oriental, Occidental, San Nicolás, Guadalupe, Dulce Nombre districts), Paraíso canton (Paraíso, Santiago, Llanos de Santa Lucía, Birrisito districts), Jiménez canton (Juan Viñas district), Turrialba canton (Turrialba, Pavones, Tres Equis districts), Alvarado canton (Cervantes, Capellades districts), Oreamuno canton (San Rafael district).

In Limón province the route covers Siquirres canton (Siquirres district).

References

Highways in Costa Rica